Soulanges is a provincial electoral district in the Montérégie region of Quebec, Canada that elects members to the National Assembly of Quebec.  It notably includes the municipalities of Saint-Lazare, Saint-Zotique and Rigaud.

It was created for the 1867 election (and an electoral district of that name existed earlier in the Legislative Assembly of the Province of Canada).  Its final election was in 1936, and its successor electoral district was Vaudreuil-Soulanges.

It was re-created for the 2003 election from parts of Salaberry-Soulanges and Vaudreuil.

In the change from the 2001 to the 2011 electoral map, its territory was unchanged.

In the change from the 2011 to the 2017 electoral map, the riding gained Hudson from Vaudreuil.

Members of the Legislative Assembly / National Assembly

Election results

* Result compared to Action démocratique

|-

|-

|-

|-

|-

|}

|-
 
|Liberal
|Lucie Charlebois
|align="right"|10,689
|align="right"|36.03
|align="right"|

|-

|-

|Independent
|Gilles Paquette
|align="right"|113
|align="right"|0.38
|align="right"|
|}

|-
 
|Liberal
|Lucie Charlebois
|align="right"|13,473
|align="right"|50.99
|align="right"|

|-

|-

|}

References

External links
Information
 Elections Quebec

Election results
 Election results (National Assembly)

Maps
 2011 map (PDF)
 2001 map (Flash)
2001–2011 changes (Flash)
1992–2001 changes (Flash)
 Electoral map of Montérégie region
 Quebec electoral map, 2011

Quebec provincial electoral districts